Beaucarne is a surname. Notable people with the surname include: 

Christophe Beaucarne (born 1965), Belgian cinematographer
Julos Beaucarne (1936–2021), Belgian artist 

French-language surnames